"Funky Friday" is a song by British rapper Dave. The song was self-released as a single on 5 October 2018 for streaming and digital download. It includes a guest appearance from fellow British rapper Fredo, and was produced by 169 and Dave. It debuted at number one on the UK Singles Chart, becoming Dave's first number one.

Background
The song was first teased by Dave on his Instagram, two days prior to the release of the song. It was released alongside a music video on 4 October 2018, directed by Dave and Nathan James Tettey.

Chart performance
In the midweek chart, "Funky Friday" was reported to enter the UK Singles Chart at number two, a total of 2,000 combined sales behind "Promises" by Calvin Harris and Sam Smith. "Funky Friday" entered the UK Singles Chart at number one for the week dated 12 October 2018, with a combined number of 6.7 million audio and video streams. It became Dave's first number one and top ten single, and Fredo's first top forty entry. It is the first song by a British rapper to peak at number one on the UK Singles Chart as a lead artist since "Not Letting Go" by Tinie Tempah featuring Jess Glynne in 2015.

The song's debut at number one served as a significant moment for British rap music.

Personnel
Credits adapted from Tidal.

 Dave – vocals, production, drums, bass guitar, piano, programming
 Fredo – vocals
 169 – additional production
 Fraser T. Smith – mixing, master engineering
 Manon Grandjean – mixing, master engineering

Charts

Weekly charts

Year-end charts

Certifications

References

2018 singles
2018 songs
Dave (rapper) songs
Fredo (rapper) songs
British hip hop songs
Songs written by Dave (rapper)
Songs written by Fraser T. Smith
Songs written by Fredo (rapper)
UK Singles Chart number-one singles